Pteris microptera  is a fern in the family Pteridaceae.

Description
The fern has a stout and erect rhizome covered with triangular brown scales. The fronds are tufted and glossy, growing to 0.5–2 m in height. The species is part of the complex and widespread Pteris comans group.

Distribution and habitat
The fern is endemic to Australia's subtropical Lord Howe Island in the Tasman Sea; it is common and widespread throughout the Island at lower elevations.

References

microptera
Endemic flora of Lord Howe Island
Plants described in 1869
Ferns of Australia
Taxa named by Friedrich Adalbert Maximilian Kuhn